Ərəbqədim (also, Arabkadim and Arabkadym) is a village and municipality in the Gobustan Rayon of Azerbaijan.  It has a population of 1,275.

References 

Populated places in Gobustan District